14 Cancri is a star in the northern zodiac constellation of Cancer. It can be referred to as ψ Cancri, very occasionally as ψ2 Cancri, to distinguish it from 13 Cancri which is sometimes called ψ1 Cancri. It is just barely visible to the naked eye, having an apparent visual magnitude of +5.73. Based upon an annual parallax shift of 24.18 mas as seen from Earth, it is located 135 light years from the Sun. It may be a member of the Wolf 630 moving group of stars.

This object has a stellar classification of G7 V, which would suggest it is a G-type main-sequence star. However, Jofré et al. (2015) consider it to be a more evolved subgiant star due to a surface gravity of log g = 3.87. As such, it has an estimated 1.5 times the mass of the Sun and 3.2 times the Sun's radius. The star is 2.4 billion years old with what appears to be a leisurely rotation rate, judging by a projected rotational velocity of 0.98 km/s. It is radiating eight times the Sun's luminosity from its photosphere at an effective temperature of 5,311 K.

References

G-type main-sequence stars
G-type subgiants
Cancri, Psi2
Cancer (constellation)
BD+25 1865
Cancri, 14
067767
040023
3191